Kamilya Jubran is a Palestinian singer, songwriter, and musician.

Early life
Kamilya Jubran was born in Acre (Akka) in 1962 to Palestinian parents. Her father Elias is a music teacher and maker of traditional Palestinian instruments such as the oud. Her brother Khaled is also a musician. Jubran and her family were featured in Telling Strings (2007), a documentary about generational differences and cultural identity in Palestine.

She moved to Jerusalem in 1981 to study social work at the Paul Baerwald School of Social Work and Social Welfare at the Hebrew University of Jerusalem. It was there that Jubran discovered her identity, history and heritage. After being introduced to Said Murad, the founder of musical group Sabreen (patient ones), Jubran joined the group in 1982 (2 years after its foundation) and became the only Palestinian member who had been born in Israel. In 2002, she moved to Europe.

Career
Jubran plays the oud and qanun, among other instruments. From 1982-2002, she was the lead singer of Sabreen, an Arabic musical group based in occupied East Jerusalem. Since 2002, she has toured solo and collaborated with a range of European musicians, including Werner Hasler.

In 2013, she was featured alongside Tom Morello and Julian Assange as a guest artist on Calle 13's single "Multi_Viral".

Discography
Sabreen
 Dukhan al-Barakin (1984)
 Mawt al-Nabi (1988)
 Jayy al-Hamam (1994)
 Ala Fein (2000)

Solo
 Wameedd (2006)
 Wanabni (2010)
 Makan (2009)
 Nhaoul' (2013)

References

Oud players
Palestinian women singers
Palestinian songwriters
Paul Baerwald School of Social Work and Social Welfare alumni
Living people
1962 births